Excoecaria bussei is a species of flowering plant in the family Euphorbiaceae. It was originally described as Sapium bussei Pax in 1903. It is native from Kenya to the Caprivi Strip.

References

bussei
Plants described in 1903
Flora of Africa